Galve can refer to:

 Lake Galvė in Lithuania
 Galve, Teruel, a town in Teruel, Spain
 Galve de Sorbe, a town in Guadalajara, Spain